Staroye Ibrayevo (İśke İbray) is a rural locality (a village) in Ibrayevsky Selsoviet, Aurgazinsky District, Bashkortostan, Russia. The population was 234 as of 2010. There are 3 streets.

Geography 
Staroye Ibrayevo is located 31 km northeast of Tolbazy (the district's administrative centre) by road. Novofyodorovka is the nearest rural locality.

References 

Rural localities in Aurgazinsky District